Carspring was an online platform for buying used cars in the United Kingdom. Launched in March 2015, the company allows users to buy or finance used cars online.

The U.K site is currently not listing cars after a loss of investment.

History 
The company was founded in March 2015 by two former consultants, Dr Peter Baumgart and Maximilian Vollenbroich.

It is backed by Berlin-based startup ‘incubator’ Rocket Internet.

How it works 
Users choose which car they would like to buy from an online catalogue, pay online, and have their car delivered to their home. Unlike other online UK car dealers, Carspring holds its own inventory as stock. Carspring adopts a similar model to US companies such as Beepi, Vroom, and Carvana.

Reception 
Startups.co.uk designed the company as the seventeenth most promising new online startup in UK.

References

Retail companies established in 2015
Internet properties established in 2015
2015 establishments in the United Kingdom